John Henry Loftus, 3rd Marquess of Ely (19 January 1814 – 15 July 1857) was a British politician.

Born in Hill Street in Mayfair, Loftus studied at Christ Church, Oxford. As Viscount Loftus, he stood unsuccessfully as a Conservative Party candidate in Gloucester, at the 1841 UK general election. In 1844, he married Jane Hope-Vere.

Loftus won the 1845 Woodstock by-election, held on 1 May that year, but succeeded as the Marquess of Ely in September. Through his subsidiary title, Baron Loftus, he took a seat in the House of Lords.

References

1814 births
1857 deaths
Alumni of Christ Church, Oxford
Conservative Party (UK) MPs for English constituencies
People from Mayfair
UK MPs 1841–1847